Streptomyces odonnellii is a bacterium species from the genus of Streptomyces which has been isolated from soil from Brazil.

See also 
 List of Streptomyces species

References

External links
Type strain of Streptomyces odonnellii at BacDive -  the Bacterial Diversity Metadatabase

odonnellii
Bacteria described in 2017